A Watermark for data synchronization describes an object of a predefined format which provides a point of reference value for two systems/datasets attempting to establish delta/incremental synchronization; any object in the queried data source which was created, modified, or deleted after the watermark's value will be qualified as "above watermark" and should be returned to the client requesting data.

This approach allows the client to retrieve only the objects which have changed since the latest watermark, and also enables the client to resume its synchronization job from where it left off in the event of some pause or downtime.

Methodology
Watermark term is often used in Directory Synchronization software development projects. For example, products such as Microsoft Exchange Server, Active Directory, Active Directory Application Mode (ADAM), and Microsoft Identity Integration Server 2003/ Microsoft Identity Lifecycle Manager Server 2007, as well as Cisco Unified Communications Manager or Sun Microsystems IPlanet and other LDAP-based directory products are using DirSync and consequently will consume "watermark" object to provide efficient synchronization between directories. Watermark object sometimes can be referred as "cookie".
DirSync control implementation can differ from product to product, however concept of watermark will allow any product to read changes in the directory incrementally.

See also
 Watermark (disambiguation)
 Microsoft Active Directory
 Microsoft Identity Integration Server
 High-water mark (computer security)

References

 "LDAP Control for Directory Synchronization" Microsoft Corporation

External links
 Understanding run profiles in MIIS 2003
 Microsoft Publishes Open Directory-Synchronization Interface
 Understanding the Directory
 LDAP Control for Directory

Data synchronization
Directory services